Upgrade is a 2022 novel by Blake Crouch. It is his tenth stand-alone novel, published three years after Summer Frost (2019). Upgrade was #6 on the New York Times Best Sellers list in the first week of publication in the category of Hardcover Fiction.

Background
The protagonist is the fictional Logan Ramsay, an agent of the Gene Protection Agency or GPA. Action takes place largely in the United States in the aftermath of 'The Great Starvation', a period of worldwide famine and death by starvation, when gene editing has become a federal crime. The Gene Protection Act outlawed gene manipulation and research and allowed draconian surveillance of citizens. Biologists, who had worked in the field were now unemployed or in prison. Those that were free were tracked down and harshly interrogated by the GPA.

Plot
As the novel begins, we learn about "The Great Starvation," an event caused by biologist, Dr. Miriam Ramsay, who released genetically modified locusts in an attempt to improve rice crops in a province of China. An unforeseen consequence of this act was that the genetically modified virus the locusts carried spread worldwide and interfered with seed germination. At least two hundred million people died and gene manipulation became a crime over the entire globe. Dr. Ramsay committed suicide and scientists involved with the project, including Dr. Ramsay's son, Logan, were imprisoned.

The story follows the protagonist, Logan Ramsay, after his release from prison. Logan found employment as an agent of the GPA, where he had a talent for tracking down fugitive geneticists, some of whom were his personal friends or those of his mother. In one such operation, in Denver, he ends us walking into a booby trap. The explosion penetrates Logan's hazmat suit and knocks him unconscious. When he regains consciousness he is in an isolation ward, where he is monitored daily by Dr. Singh. Initially, Dr. Singh seems concerned about the pain Logan is experiencing. But gradually, the doctor admits that he is monitoring Logan since he may have been exposed to a biological agent due to the explosion in Denver. The first sign that Logan is undergoing physiological changes is a bone density tests that shows Logan's bones more than twice as dense as that of a typical male. After a week, when Logan's fever is broken, Dr. Singh allows Logan's fourteen-year-old daughter, Ava, to visit him while wearing full hazmat gear. The father and daughter spend time playing chess and Logan is surprised to find that he easily beats his daughter at chess even though she was a vastly superior chess player before. After her ninth consecutive loss in subsequent days, Ava inquires: “What the actual hell is going on here?” 

After his release from the hospital, Logan is arrested and secreted at a GPA black ops site. One of his captors, Dr. Romero administers a battery of IQ tests. It gradually becomes clear to both Dr. Romero and Logan that Logan's genetic code had been upgraded. Logan develops virtually perfect memory for both recent events and those in his distant past. He remembers verbatim every book he had ever read, including his college texts. Prior to the upgrade, Logan had forgotten most of the French he had taken in college, but now he finds that he is fluent. Logan's pattern recognition and manipulation of numbers and sequences of numbers literally puts Logan off-scale on IQ tests administered by Dr. Romero. Before the seeming upgrade Logan's IQ had been measured at 118, slightly above average. Now, Dr. Romero admits that Logan's IQ is unmeasurably high and certainly above 200.

One of his jailers, Edwin Rogers, admits that Logan's family had been told that he had died. It is clear that the GPA and likely the Department of Defense plan to study Logan as a lab rat in their attempt to understand what he has become. By this time, Logan's intelligence had improved to the point that he thinks and talks much faster than a normal human being. His manual dexterity is such that he can do a hand stand on one hand and jump up on a desk from the crouch position. By this time, Logan is convinced that the GPA will never release him and he is resolute that he will try to escape at the first opportunity.

When an opportunity to escape his confinement arises, Logan learns from his sister that his mother had faked her suicide. Their mother, who had a genius IQ of 180, surrounded herself with brilliant geneticists, biologists, and computer scientists, and clandestinely developed an upgrade to Homo Sapiens, by editing the genome of human beings. Miriam's first two subjects are her own son and daughter, Logan and Kara. Logan and Kara set out to find their mother using a message embedded in their genetic code. When they reach the coordinates of their mother's location near Santa Fe, New Mexico, they find that Miriam had committed suicide, this time for real, due to her advancing Alzheimer's disease. She leaves a videotaped message suggesting that her children's upgrade is part of a grander, darker plan.

Critical reception
According to The New York Times, the novel "is sleek and propulsive, a page-turner with unexpectedly beautiful passages that give you pause amid the thrills."

References

2022 American novels
2022 science fiction novels
American science fiction novels
American thriller novels
Ballantine Books books